Mondli Mpoto (born 24 July 1998) is a South African soccer player currently playing as a goalkeeper for Royal AM.

Career statistics

Club

Notes

International

References

1998 births
Living people
South African soccer players
South Africa international soccer players
South Africa under-20 international soccer players
South Africa youth international soccer players
Association football goalkeepers
South African Premier Division players
SuperSport United F.C. players
Bloemfontein Celtic F.C. players
Royal AM F.C. players
Footballers at the 2020 Summer Olympics
Olympic soccer players of South Africa